The 1924 Arkansas Razorbacks football team represented the University of Arkansas in the Southwest Conference (SWC) during the 1924 college football season. In their third year under head coach Francis Schmidt, the Razorbacks compiled a 7–2–1 record (1–2–1 against SWC opponents), finished in seventh place in the SWC, and outscored all opponents by a combined total of 227 to 69.

Schedule

References

Arkansas
Arkansas Razorbacks football seasons
Arkansas Razorbacks football